Perales (Spanish: pear trees) may refer to:

Places
 Perales, Palencia, Castile and León, Spain
 Perales, Los Santos, Panama
 Perales del Alfambra, in Teruel, Aragón, Spain
 Perales del Puerto, in Cáceres, Extremadura, Spain
 Perales del Río, a neighbourhood of Getafe, in Madrid, Spain
 Perales Airport, in Ibagué, Tolima, Colombia

People
 Eric L. Perales, U.S.A. National League Water Polo Coach
 Cesar A. Perales, American Civil Rights Attorney
 Eva Perales, Spanish TV personality
 Fernando Martínez Perales, Spanish footballer
 José Luis Perales, Spanish singer
 Juan de Dios Ramírez Perales, Mexican footballer
 Priscila Perales, Mexican beauty queen

Other 
 Perales River